Wichí Lhamtés Nocten, or Weenhayek, is a Wichí language primarily spoken in Bolivia, where an estimated 1,810 Wichí people spoke it in 1994. An additional one hundred people spoke the language in Argentina in 1994. In Bolivia, the language is spoken in the north-central Tarija Department, southwest of Pilcomayo River, and in Cordillera de Pirapo. In Argentina, it is spoken in from the northern border south to Tartagal, Salta. The language is also called Mataco, Bolivian, Mataco Nocten, Nocten, Noctenes, Oktenai, and Weenhayek; the last name is used in the Bolivian constitution of 2009.

See also
Wichí Lhamtés Vejoz
Wichí Lhamtés Güisnay

Notes

Matacoan languages
Languages of Argentina
Languages of Bolivia